Louise Prussing (1895–1994) was an American stage and film actress. Known primarily for her roles on Broadway, she also appeared in a number of silent films including the 1929 British film The Woman in White.

Filmography
 Out Yonder (1919)
 His Wife's Money (1920)
 A Fool and His Money (1920)
 What's Your Reputation Worth? (1921)
 Worlds Apart (1921)
 The Girl from Nowhere (1921)
 Reckless Youth (1922)
 Jan of the Big Snows (1922)
 The Thoroughbred (1928)
 The Woman in White (1929)
 Before Morning (1933)

References

Bibliography 
 Bordman, Gerald . American Theatre: A Chronicle of Comedy and Drama, 1930-1969. Oxford University Press, 1996.
 Glynn, Stephen. The British Horseracing Film: Representations of the ‘Sport of Kings’ in British Cinema. Springer,  2019.
 McGrath, Patrick J. . John Garfield: The Illustrated Career in Films and on Stage''. McFarland,  2006.

External links 
 

1895 births
1994 deaths
American film actresses
American stage actresses
People from  Chicago